Renshaw is an Old English locational surname for a village in the area of Prestbury, Cheshire that disappeared before the 17th Century.  The suffix -shaw means "wood". The earliest variant spelling Renshae is dated 1561.  Other variants include Ravenshaw and Rainshaw. Renshaw is uncommon as a given name.

Notable persons with that surname include:
 Birdsey Renshaw (1911–1948), American neuroscientist
 Deborah Renshaw (born 1975), American racing driver
 Ernest Renshaw (1861–1899), English tennis player
 Graham Renshaw FRSE (1872-1952) British physician and aviculturist
 Jack Renshaw (1909–1987), Australian politician
 Kenneth Renshaw, American violinist
 Mark Renshaw (born 1982), Australian cyclist
 Matthew Renshaw (born 1996), Australian cricketer
 Molly Renshaw (born 1996), English swimmer
 Peter Renshaw, British creative learning consultant
 Richard T. Renshaw (1822–1879), American naval officer
 Samuel Renshaw (1892–1981), American psychologist
 Sharyn Renshaw, Australian lawn bowls player
 William Renshaw (disambiguation), several people

See also
 Renshaw (disambiguation)
 Ravenshaw

References

English-language surnames